Ekaterina Yuryevna Yashina (born 6 August 1993) is a professional Russian tennis player. On 7 January 2019, she reached her highest singles ranking of world No. 335, whilst her best WTA doubles ranking was 129 on 30 January 2023.

She made her WTA Tour main-draw debut at the 2011 Tashkent Open gaining entry as a wildcard, partnering Sabina Sharipova.

WTA 125 tournament finals

Doubles: 1 (runner–up)

ITF Circuit finals

Singles: 10 (4 titles, 6 runner–ups)

Doubles: 66 (33 titles, 33 runner–ups)

References

External links
 
 
 

1993 births
Living people
Russian female tennis players
Universiade medalists in tennis
Sportspeople from Kazan
Universiade silver medalists for Russia
Medalists at the 2013 Summer Universiade
20th-century Russian women
21st-century Russian women